American School of Douala (ASD) is an American international school in Douala, Cameroon. It serves preschool through grade 12 and was established in 1978. It is located at Avenue des Palmiers in Bonapriso, a luxury residential neighborhood in Douala

References

External links
 

American international schools in Cameroon
Schools in Douala
Educational institutions established in 1978
1978 establishments in Cameroon